John Burnheim (born in 1927 in Sydney, Australia) is a former professor of General Philosophy at the University of Sydney, Australia.

Early career 
Burnheim was formerly a Catholic priest and, from 1958-1968, was rector of St John's, the Catholic college attached to the university. He became a major figure in the disturbances of the 1970s that split the university's Department of Philosophy.

Social theory
In his book Is Democracy Possible? The alternative to electoral politics (1985) Burnheim used the term "demarchy" (created by Friedrich Hayek in his Law, Legislation and Liberty) to describe a political system without the state or bureaucracies, and based instead on randomly selected groups of decision makers. This has striking resemblances to classical democratic ideas, as reported by Thucydides. In 2006 Burnheim published a second edition with a new preface in which he directed the reader to an emphasis that "a polity organised by negotiation between specialised authorities would work much better than one based on centralised authority".

Demarchy as Burnheim conceives it has two features that distinguish it from other proposals for selection by lot in politics:

First, an insistence on putting distinct policy areas under mutually independent authorities which would settle problems of coordination  between them by negotiation or arbitration rather than by dictation from above. The point of this is to remedy the defect of existing democracies in which issues are settled according to the power strategies of politicians rather than the merits of the case;

Second, that the committee in charge of each policy body should be statistically representative of those who are most substantially affected by their decisions. The hope is that this would lead to better decisions, not just the wishful thinking of populist spin.

In 2016 John Burnheim published "The Demarchy Manifesto: for better public policy."  Where  Is Democracy Possible is theoretical, the manifesto suggests a practical approach to current problems, aimed at divorcing the process of "enlightening, articulating and giving effect to public opinion" on selected issues of policy from the electoral party system. It envisaged setting up a public foundation, financed by private contributions, to conduct the proceedings, relying on the complete transparency and participatory amplitude of its proceedings to justify its claim to articulate a view that deserves to be seen as serious public opinion on a range of important matters. The key to complete openness is a website where anybody who chooses to do so may contribute, dedicated to deciding the best way of dealing with a specific problem. Contributors would be expected to appeal to considerations that most people would accept as directly relevant to the particular problem. The editors would attempt to see that all the considerations that either ordinary people or experts might have were thoroughly debated, establishing the considerations a good solution should take into account. That discussion should lead to clarity about just what facts and values are relevant, but still leave a lot of disagreement about the relative weight placed on them in articulating an acceptable decision. A second small body would be charged with attempting to arrive at a practical compromise between conflicting considerations. The suggestion is that this should be a small committee, statistically representative of the interests most strongly advantaged or disadvantaged by what is to be decided. This body would also operate entirely by correspondence online, open to comment at every stage.

The book tries to tie this proposal up with a realistic approach to the more general issues of public goods, practical uncertainty, social processes and global problems.

References

Burnheim J. {2011). To Reason Why: from religion to philosophy and beyond, Sydney University Press
Burnheim J. (2016). The Demarchy Manifesto: for better public policy , imprint Academic, UK, SUP Australia
Franklin J. (2003). Corrupting the Youth: A History of Philosophy in Australia, Macleay Press, ch. 11

External links

Australian philosophers
Political philosophers
Living people
Academic staff of the University of Sydney
1927 births